Qasr el Banat (Arabic: قصر البنات) is an ancient temple (probably Roman) situated  east of Chlifa in the Baalbek District of the Beqaa Governorate in the city of Qsarnaba (Lebanon).

History
It is believed the site was called the "Castle of Virgins" and was the residence of virgins in Roman times. Indeed, the Arabic word "Qasr" comes from the Latin "castrum" (meaning in English: "castle").

By the middle of the 2nd century, the Romans had built many small temples and other sanctuaries in the vicinity of the temple district of Heliopolis, today's Baalbek, on the edge of the Bekaa. They were pilgrimage destinations for the inhabitants of the big cities on the coast. One of the Roman processional streets, partly carved out of the rock, led from here directly to the mountain temples of Hosn Niha. One of the most famous is the one in the village of Qsarnaba, called now "Castra El Banaat".

George F. Taylor classified Qasr el Banat among a group of ancient Roman Temples of the Beqaa Valley. It is suggested to date to Ancient Roman, but it is possible that it was originally built, as a very small temple, during Ancient Greek eras or earlier. The top of the hill is covered in various platforms, cisterns, tanks and steps that have been carved out of solid bedrock. Within the remains is a small antae temple, constructed of large square blocks that was used as a fortress in later times. Some sections remain intact built up two or three layers high. A basilica (probably Byzantine Christian) from a later period was built alongside the temple.

Characteristics
The Prostylos Temple of Qsarnaba, with the entrance on the east side, stood on a high platform, reached by a wide flight of steps with over 20 steps. The walls of the podium were moved to the east and formed a lateral conclusion of the stairs. The mighty limestone curbs of the former Cella wall, which are distributed on the site, are weathered to some extent to the shapelessness. In 1974, the first phase of the restoration was completed, in which up to three rows of temple walls could be restored. In the middle section of the cella, the stepped base of a raised cult place can be seen. A separate sacrificial altar stands outside in the east at the foot of the staircase.

It was composed of parts and supplemented in a further restoration phase after 1993. The columns of the vestibule were crowned by Corinthian capitals.
Individual parts of the pediment triangle were assembled in the original form and placed as a whole at ground level next to the temple. In the upper cornice, a carved relief bust is preserved at the top of the gable. It shows the bearded head of a man who probably represents the founder of the building.

See also
 
 Temples of the Beqaa Valley
 Roman Phoenicia

References

External links
Photo of the temple at Qasr el Banat on picasaweb
Photo of the temple at Qasr el Banat on panoramio.com
Photo of the temple at Qasr el Banat on panoramio.com
Photo of the view from Qasr el Banat on panoramio.com
Visiting Deir el Ahmar in Bekaa Valley, Lebanese Ministry of Tourism brochure
Qasr El-Banat on middleeast.com
Qasr el Banat on mapatlas.org
Qasr el Banat on geographic.org

Baalbek District
Archaeological sites in Lebanon
Ancient Roman temples
Roman sites in Lebanon
Tourist attractions in Lebanon